Adama ɓii Ardo Hassana (1786 – 1847), more commonly known as Modibbo Adama, was a Fulani scholar and holy warrior, who hailed from the Ba'en clan of Fulbe. He led a jihad into the region of Fombina (in modern-day Cameroon and Nigeria), opening the region for Fulani colonisation.

Adama studied in Hausaland and earned the title "Modibbo" ("Lettered One") for his scholarship. Upon finishing his studies, he returned home to Gurin and learned of the jihad declared by Fulani mystic Usman dan Fodio, who ordered Adama to extend his jihad east as "Lamido Fombina" (Ruler of the Southlands).

Adama raised an army and attacked Bata settlements near Gurin, then took on Mandara, the largest and best organised state in the region, and eventually conquered the Mandara capital, Dulo, with ease. However, the Mandara army counterattacked and recaptured the town. Though he fought many more campaigns, Adama spent most of his time in Yola, which became his capital. He set about creating the administrative structure of his new state, which he named Adamawa after himself, which was subordinate only to Usman dan Fodio in Sokoto.  Upon Adama's death in 1847, his son Muhammadu Lawal became Lamido of Adamawa, but colonial battles and division eventually destroyed the independent Fulani state. 

As a result of Adama's constant warring, the Fulani today make up the largest ethnic group in Northern Cameroon (at more than 60% of the region's entire population, which considering the fact that they weren't from the area, is a remarkable feat), and Islam is the dominant religion. The wars also forced many peoples south into the forest region.

Early life

Adama came from a respected but humble family; his father, Hassana, was a well regarded scholar of Islam and minor nobleman from Ba'ajo. Adama travelled to Bornu for his education, where he stayed for some time under the tutelage of Mallam Kiari. He continued his studies in Hausaland (modern Northern Nigeria), where legend says his teacher was the Fulani Shehu Usman dan Fodio in Degel. Adama proved a bright scholar and a pious Muslim, and he earned the title Modibo, "Lettered One". After several years away, he returned home to Guringa around 1804. There, the news was grim. Adama's father had died in 1803 fighting the Bata.

Jihad

Talk in Guringa also concerned events in Hausaland. Word had arrived that Usman dan Fodio had declared a militant jihad on the Hausa leaders. He had installed himself at Gudu and subsequently defeated non-Fulani leaders at Gobir and Kébbi. Usman had now turned his attention to Bornu and to the vast southlands of Fumbina (modern-day Northern Cameroon).

Adama's mandate

Still, the picture seemed unclear to leaders farther from the fighting. Was Usman a Mujaddid (reformer), or was he the Mahdi, a saviour figure who would create an ideal Muslim society? In 1805 or 1806, the Fulani leaders at Guringa assembled a delegation to visit Usman and find out. Adama's pious reputation and familiarity with Hausaland made him a natural fit for the mission.

The party met Usman in 1806, probably in Gwandu. There, they learned that his intention was to extend his jihad eastward, into Fumbina. The goal was ostensibly to convert various Kirdi (pagan) peoples to Islam and to protect Muslims who already lived in the area. The jihadists were also supposed to educate the region's current Muslim population, many of whom merged Islam with paganism.

Though not the oldest member, Adama was one of the more zealous about Usman's ideas. Usman thus presented him with a command that would change his life dramatically. The Shehu gave Adama his blessing and presented him with a flag, the symbol of command in Usman's army. The Shehu then charged Adama to carry the jihad into Fumbina and from the Nile to the Bight of Biafra. Adama also received the power to distribute flags of command to others, thus establishing more centres of Fulani Islam and spreading the war to farther reaches.

Early campaigns

Adama immediately began recruiting Fulani and Hausa volunteers and mercenaries.  These were mainly mounted cavalrymen fighting with sword, bow, and poisoned arrow. Adama forbade them to pillage or to kill indiscriminately, but enemy nations were given two choices: convert to Islam or become a tributary state. Those ethnic groups that lacked a centralised government had but one: become slaves to the Fulani and convert to their faith.

The non-Fulani Muslims of the Adamawa largely rejected Adama's jihad; they viewed it as little more than an excuse to spread Fulani hegemony. However, it was primarily the Fulani leaders (ardo'en, singular: ardo) of Fumbina with whom Adama was concerned. Some of them rejected his primacy for various reasons: He was from a fairly humble background, he owned little wealth, his army was still small, and he lacked charisma. The majority, however, welcomed Adama as a military commander or religious leader at the very least. Adama's son-in-law, Jauro Dembo, had already settled in Fumbina at Malabu and became one of his lieutenants.

The makeshift army made headquarters at Gurin, a fort at the junction of the Faro and Benue Rivers where Fulani warriors had regrouped after fighting the Bata in 1803. Adama then led his forces in a series of strikes on Bata settlements such as Pema, Tepa, and Turuwa. The victories elated Adama's men, who took numerous Bata slaves.

The early successes convinced more local Fulani leaders to come to Adama's side. Even those ardo'en who opposed his political rule recognised the jihad as an opportunity to expand their territories. Njobdi of the Wollarbe clan is one notable example, and his major rival, Hammam Sambo, perhaps the first ardo to have settled in Fumbina, proved the major holdout. Bitter relations between Njobdi and Hammam would prove a major obstacle in Adama's quest to maintain a cohesive empire.

In addition, common Fulani were inspired by Adama's exploits and formed into bands. Adama created a new position for their leaders: The lamido (plural: lamibe), who was the leader of a particular territory, as opposed to an ardo, leader of a particular people. Both groups received flags of command and shared the same status in Adama's armies. Before his death, Adama would appoint over 40 non-ardo lamibe. They would prove his most loyal lieutenants.

Mandara campaign

Adama turned his attentions on the only major state in Fumbina that could present a threat to his fledgling emirate: Mandara. It was an attractive target. It lay between Bornu to the north and Baghirmi in the Chad Basin, so its fall would facilitate the conquest of these areas. Its people were already Muslim, though they mixed the religion with pagan practices. Moreover, it had a large population from whom soldiers could be conscripted, and it was renowned for its excellent horses. Mandara was well organised, however, and would not be an easy prize. The people who lived there, the Mandarawa, had a long-standing rivalry with the Fulani, who had fought them under the Bornu in previous years. This animosity only served to drive more Fulani to Adama's armies, though, as many veterans were eager for another crack at an old rival. Furthermore, Fulbe rulers Modibo Damraka and others were already embroiled in fighting against the Mandara in the Diamaré Plain. Sentiment for jihad was high.

Adama reached Guringa in 1809 with a large army in good morale. He quickly conquered the Mandara settlement at Guider and headed north, taking several more villages along the way. Outside of the Mandara capital, Dulo, Adama demanded that the king, Bukar Djiama, swear his allegiance and convert to Islam untainted with paganism. Bukar agreed to acknowledged Adama's right to rule his own subjects, but he refused to yield his own sovereignty. Adama and his men took Dulo with little fighting.

Adama searched for someone to rule the settlement, but he found no one whom he felt adequate for the post. Meanwhile, his troops revelled in their plunder. No one expected the Mandara counterattack, which was launched from nearby Mora. Adama fled the town, and Dulo fell from his grasp forever.

Administration

Adama and his men retreated to Yola (in present-day Nigeria). The town would become his capital by 1841. From here, he and his lieutenants continued to expand the emirate, which he named Adamawa after himself. The subordinates had to send him tribute in the form of cattle. Large settlements such as Maroua, Garoua, and Ngaoundéré fell to Adama or his lieutenants. By 1825, the Fulani had penetrated the Adamawa Plateau. Nevertheless, Adama lived in relatively moderate surroundings and never acquired great wealth.

From Yola, Adama began the administrative tasks necessary for his nascent state. He did this with Usman's advice; he was to foster understanding between his people and their governors, facilitate communication between elders and their subordinates, and prevent the stratification of society based on class or wealth. The empire eventually took on three administrative tiers. At the centre was the emir al-Mu'minin ("commander of the faithful"), Adama himself, ruling from Yola and answering only to Usman dan Fodio in Sokoto. A contingent of councillors and administrators directly aided him, and a household staff of non-Fulbe and slaves doubled as his bodyguard. Below him were a number of district leaders, the lamibe (singular: lamido), who ruled key settlements. Under them were a number of villages, each headed by a village chief.

Meanwhile, some of the older ardo'en grew powerful through their own conquests. They regarded the unconquered areas near their territories as their own private backyards and defended these zones from all comers. This sometimes surfaced in their relations with Adama, such as when Bouba Njida of Rai refused to come to Adama's aid when the emir was fighting the Namchi at Poli. Instead, Bouba waited for Adama to retreat from the area to bring in his own forces and finish the enemy off. He then sent prisoners from the battle to Adama as a gift.

Legacy

Adama died in 1847 and was laid to rest at Yola (his tomb survives to this day). Adamawa covered 103,000 km² from Lake Chad to Banyo and was inhabited by 1,500,000 people. Further expansion to the south had proved difficult and undesirable since the presence of the tsetse fly and thick jungle made cattle rearing difficult there.

Adama's son Muhammadu Lawal succeeded him after a brief regency under Hamidu bi Adama. Eventually, three of Adama's other sons would at some point serve as Emir of Adamawa. Not until the British and German colonial periods would the emirate come to an end.

Despite their loss of independence, the Fulani were now the preeminent ethnic group of Northern Cameroon. They spread Islam throughout the region, establishing it as the dominant religion. Education also flourished, as new converts learned Arabic writing and studied the Qur'an. Trade flourished, and communications with it. The conquests were also important ecologically. Lands that had once been used for cultivation now became part of Fulani pastureland. Herdsmen cut down trees to make way for cattle, and they burned grasses that their herds later trampled. Centuries of such behaviour have replaced the region's forest with savanna.

Ironically, the Adamawa was more sparsely populated after Adama's conquest. Rather than fight the Fulani invaders, many peoples fled, displacing others in turn. The Adamawa Plateau, once home to many of Cameroon's ethnic groups, soon became a pastureland, and the forest zone of Cameroon became more heavily populated.

References

DeLancey, Mark W., and DeLancey, Mark Dike (2000): Historical Dictionary of the Republic of Cameroon (3rd ed.). Lanham, Maryland: The Scarecrow Press.
 Fanso, V. G. (1989). Cameroon History for Secondary Schools and Colleges, Vol. 1: From Prehistoric Times to the Nineteenth Century. Hong Kong: Macmillan Education Ltd.
Johnston, H. A. S. (1967): The Fulani Empire of Sokoto. Chapter 8: "The Jihad in Adamawa and Bauchi". London: Oxford University Press.
Ngoh, Victor Julius (1996): History of Cameroon Since 1800. Limbe: Presbook.
Njeuma, Martin Z. (1990): "The lamidates of northern Cameroon, 1800–1894", Introduction to the History of Cameroon in the Nineteenth and Twentieth Centuries. Palgrave MacMillan.

1786 births
1847 deaths
Sokoto Caliphate
Fula people
Fulani warriors
18th-century Nigerian people